The Soviet Union women's national under-18 volleyball team represents Soviet Union in international women's volleyball competitions and friendly matches under the age 18 and it was ruled by the Soviet Union Volleyball Federation That was a member of The Federation of International Volleyball FIVB and also a part of European Volleyball Confederation CEV.

Results

FIVB U18 World Championship
 Champions   Runners up   Third place   Fourth place

The Soviet Union women's national under18 volleyball team did not compete in any European youth Championship cause the team was dissolved in late 1991 before the first European youth championship that take place in 1995.

Team

1989 World Championship U18 Squad

Tatyana Gratcheva, Elena Ponomareva, Evgeniya Kotel'nikova-Shvydkaya, Inna Dashuk, Marina Egorova, Olesya Karalyus, Olga Karslıoğlu, Inessa Korkmaz, Natalya Morozova, Olga Nikolaeva, Yuliya Timonova, Olga Fadeeva.

1991 World Championship U18 Squad

Nataliya Alekseevna Gomzina, Larisa Yarovenko, Anastasia Petrenko, Elvira Savostianova, Evgeniya Artamonova-Estes, Natalia Hanikoğlu, Natalya Kurnosova, Elizaveta Tishchenko, Lyudmila Gilyazutdinova, Tatiana Smirnova, Anna Voeikova, Natalya Belousova.

References

External links

Official website
FIVB profile

 

National women's under-18 volleyball teams
Volleyball in the Soviet Union